Edificio Avante is a  skyscraper located in the Santa Elena area of San Salvador, El Salvador. Construction started in early 2009 and was due to finish in mid-2010.  

The building was financed by a Guatemalan investor, using a financing scheme called "tenant in hand", because they sell the space to investors, then Quality Real Estate is responsible for seeking a tenant for that space, so the constructors of Avante made sure all of their investors a safe return. Salvadorans who have been investors in Guatemala already know the model of Avante.

This building helps the economic growth of the country; due to the low quantity of office buildings in the country the building helps the economic boom of the city.

In the building you will find the Newtown Cafe, a cafeteria that offers urban fusion cuisine.

References

External links
Official site (in Spanish)

Skyscrapers in El Salvador
Skyscraper office buildings

Newtown Cafe Menu :https://www.yumpu.com/xx/document/read/66875025/menu-restaurante-carta